Statistics of Guam League in the 1997 season.

Overview
Tumon Soccer Club won the championship.

References
RSSSF

Guam Soccer League seasons
Guam
Guam
football